Following are the results of the 1996 Croatian Indoors singles competition.  The 1996 Croatian Indoors was a tennis tournament played on indoor carpet courts at the Dom Sportova in Zagreb in Croatia and was part of the World Series of the 1996 ATP Tour. The tournament ran from 29 January through 4 February 1996.

Goran Ivanišević won in the final 3–6, 6–3, 6–2 against Cédric Pioline.

Seeds

  Goran Ivanišević (champion)
  Arnaud Boetsch (first round)
  Andrea Gaudenzi (second round)
  David Prinosil (first round)
  Bernd Karbacher (first round)
  Jakob Hlasek (first round)
  Javier Sánchez (second round)
  Adrian Voinea (quarterfinals)

Draw

Finals

Top half

Bottom half

References
 1996 Croatian Indoors Draw

Singles
Singles
Croatian Indoors - Singles